Dr. Jacob (Jake) Lozada was nominated by U.S. Office of Personnel Management Director to serve as the Human Resource Agency's special advisor to the Director of OPM for Diversity Strategy.  He was nominated by President George W. Bush as the Assistant Secretary of the United States Department of Veterans Affairs. Formerly a management consultant with Electronic Data Systems (EDS) in Herndon, Virginia.  He is a 27-year veteran of the United States Army, a graduate of the University of Puerto Rico, and received an M.H.A. from Baylor University, and a Ph.D. from Walden University.

Brief biography
Lozada was commissioned a U.S. Army second lieutenant through the Army Reserve Officers' Training Corps (ROTC) Program from the University of Puerto Rico.  He served in the Jacob United States Army Medical Corps for 25 years, attaining the rank of colonel.

On April 30, 2001, President George W. Bush nominated him to be Assistant Secretary of Veterans Affairs.

On February 28, 2003, nominated by U.S. Office of Personnel Management Director to serve as the Human Resource Agency's special advisor to the Director of OPM for Diversity Strategy.

Military career
Lozada held several commands in his 26 years in the army, such as assistant I.G. Health Services Command, Fort Sam Houston, Texas, 1980 to 1983. commander, 8th Evac. Hosp, Fort Ord, California, 1983 to 1985. chief, Force Structure, Health Services Command, Fort Sam Houston, Texas, 1986 to 1989, deputy commander admin., 121st Evac. Hospital, Seoul, Korea, 1989 to 1991, director C4, Joint Multinational Training Command (JMRTC), 1990–91, deputy chief of operations, Army Medical Research Development Command  (USAMRDC), 1991 to 1993 in Fort Detrick, Maryland.

Among Jacob Lozada military awards are the Legion of Merit, the Defense Meritorious Service Medal, the Meritorious Service Medal (6 awards), the Army Commendation Medal, the Armed Forces Expeditionary Medal, the National Defense Service Medal and the Armed Forces Reserve Medal.

Education
BA, University of Puerto Rico, PR, 1966 
MHA, Baylor University, Waco, TX, 1979 
PhD, Walden University, 1995

Professional memberships and associations
Interamerican College of Physicians and Surgeons National Hispanic Youth Initiative, Former National Board Member for AARP 2006–2014 and past president of the Fort Detrick Chapter of the Association of the United States Army (AUSA).

See also

List of notable Puerto Ricans

References

External links
Jacob Lozada Bio by Dr. A. David Mangelsdorff, Ph.D., M.P.H.

Living people
AARP people
American politicians of Puerto Rican descent
Baylor University alumni
People from San Lorenzo, Puerto Rico
Puerto Rican Army personnel
Puerto Rican military officers
Recipients of the Legion of Merit
Recipients of the Meritorious Service Medal (United States)
University of Puerto Rico alumni
United States Army officers
United States Army colonels
United States Department of Veterans Affairs officials
Walden University (Minnesota) alumni
1944 births